HD 192310 (also known as 5 G. Capricorni or Gliese 785) is a star in the southern constellation of Capricornus. (According to the Bortle scale, it can be viewed from dark suburban skies.) HD 192310 is suspected of being a variable star, but this is unconfirmed.

Description 
This is a K-type main sequence star with a stellar classification of K2+ V. HD 192310 has about 78% of the Sun's mass and, depending on the estimation method, 79% to 85% of the radius of the Sun. The effective temperature of the photosphere is about 5069 K, giving it the orange-hued glow of a K-type star. It is older than the Sun, with age estimates in the range 7.5–8.9 billion years. The proportion of elements other than hydrogen and helium, known as the metallicity, is similar to that of the Sun. It is spinning slowly, completing a rotation roughly every 48 days.

The space velocity components of this star are (U, V, W) = . It is following an orbit through the Milky Way galaxy that has an orbital eccentricity of 0.18 at a mean galactocentric distance of 8.1 kpc. The star will achieve perihelion in around 82,200 years when it comes within  of the Sun.

Planetary system
The system has a Neptune-mass planet "b", discovered in 2010. A second planet "c" was found in this system in 2011 by the HARPS GTO program, along with HD 85512 b and the planets of 82 G. Eridani. The uncertainty in the mass of the second planet is much higher than for the first because of the lack of coverage around the full orbit. Both planets may be similar in composition to Neptune. They are orbiting along the inner and outer edges of the habitable zone for this star.

A study in 2023 updated the parameters of these two planets, and identified a number of additional radial velocity signals. While most of these signals are attributed to stellar activity, one is considered a planet candidate. If real, this third planet would be a super-Earth orbiting closer to the star than the two known planets.

See also
 List of star systems within 25–30 light-years

References

External links
 

K-type main-sequence stars
HR, 7722
Capricorni, 5
099825
192310
0785
Durchmusterung objects
7722
Planetary systems with two confirmed planets
Capricornus (constellation)